Genesis is a 1986 Hindi-language film directed by Mrinal Sen. The film stars Shabana Azmi, Naseeruddin Shah and Om Puri. It was entered into the 1986 Cannes Film Festival.

Plot 
A farmer (Naseeruddin Shah) and a weaver (Om Puri) exchange their products for goods provided by a regular passing trader (M.K. Raina). A woman (Shabana Azmi) arrives, forcing the two men's desires but also urging them to obtain more recompense from the trader. After a visit to a village fair, the two men become more acquisitive and jealousies break out over the now pregnant woman who simply ups and leaves. As the two men fight each other, the trader's men attack and enslave the workers again.

Cast 
 Shabana Azmi as The Woman
 Naseeruddin Shah as The Farmer
 Om Puri as The Weaver
 M.K. Raina as The Trader

References

External links

 Genesis (MrinalSen.org)

1986 films
1980s Hindi-language films
Films directed by Mrinal Sen
Films based on Indian novels
Films scored by Ravi Shankar
Films based on works by Samaresh Basu